Amurlingkui (1886–1930), courtesy name Yimang (意莽), Chinese name Se Enfu, was a Khorchin Mongol nobleman. He was the 13th Jasagh prince of Horqin Left Rear Banner and the last holder of the peerage.

Family 
Amurlingkui was a Borjigin descended from Qasar, the younger brother of Genghis Khan. He was the great grandson of Sengge Rinchen.

In 1891, Amurlingkui was only six years old when he succeeded his grandfather Buyannemekü. He received  higher education and was able to write in Classical Chinese. He was good at writing poems, prose and calligraphy. After reaching adulthood, he was put in charge of his own fief in Horqin.

During the Xinhai revolution, Amurlingkui and other Mongol noblemen organized the league of Mongol princes supporting the house of Aisin-Gioro. However, after Yuan Shikai took over the power, the Mongol noblemen turned their support to Yuan instead.

With the fall of the Qing dynasty, he became a senator in the provisional senate of the Republic of China and a member of the political council. He also participated in the second congress of Republic of China. He died in the year of 1930. His son Heshig inherited the Jasagh status but lost the title of prince.

The later years of Amurlingkui were troubled by economic crisis of his family. Taxes could no longer be collected from the peasants of his fief, and salaries from the congress were not sufficient to support his many relatives. He eventually had to sell his mansion in Beijing in order to relieve himself from the plight.

Sources 

Borjigin
Chinese people of Mongolian descent
1886 births
1930 deaths